Timofey Yuryevich Chalyy (Cyrillic: Тимофей Юрьевич Чалый; born 7 April 1994) is a Russian athlete specialising in the 400 metres hurdles. He represented his country at the 2013 World Championships reaching the semifinals. In addition, he finished fourth at the 2014 European Championships.

His personal best in the event is 48.57 seconds set in Moscow  in 2016. With 49.23, set in 2013, he holds the Russian junior record.

Competition record

References

1994 births
Living people
Russian male hurdlers
European Games competitors for Russia
Athletes (track and field) at the 2019 European Games
World Athletics Championships athletes for Russia
Russian Athletics Championships winners
21st-century Russian people